Captain Humphrey Willis was an English soldier in Ireland in the sixteenth century, his parents are unknown. Captain Willis was appointed Sheriff of County Donegal and County Fermanagh by the Lord Deputy of Ireland William FitzWilliam. Captain Willis was a fluent speaker of Irish, and enforced his authority with a detachment of the Irish Army.

Willis' appointment in Donegal antagonised the local Gaelic lords the O'Donnells who had traditionally enjoyed a close relationship with the Crown. Following his escape from his imprisonment in Dublin Castle, the young heir to the O'Donnell leadership Hugh Roe O'Donnell drove Willis out of Donegal, one of the actions that anticipated the coming Tyrone's Rebellion. In 1593 Willis had a new role as Sheriff of Fermanagh. Again he clashed with a local Gaelic lord Hugh Maguire who drove him out of the area. Maguire entered into open rebellion in the crown; and in 1594 laid siege to Enniskillen, attempting to retake the castle and triggering an outbreak of fighting that became Nine Years of War in Ireland, culminating in the flight of the Earls from Ireland in 1607.

He helped organise Sir Henry Docwra's expedition to Derry in 1600, where he liaised with local Gaelic figures who wished to ally themselves with the Crown against Hugh Roe O'Donnell and his ally Hugh O'Neill, Earl of Tyrone. Captain Humphrey Willis was killed in action in Ulster in 1602, a report to the Lord Deputy and Council & to the English Privy Council dated 14.7.1602 recorded the deaths of Sir John Barkley and Captain Willis during a campaign led by Mountjoy against Tyrone in Monaghan "to push him from the plains into the fastness where he now is."

George Willis of Aghatirourke, who discovered the Florencecourt Yew, was a descendant.

References

Bibliography
 McGurk, John. Sir Henry Docwra, 1564-1631: Derry's Second Founder. Four Courts Press, 2006.
 Morgan, Christopher. William Cecil, Ireland, and the Tudor State. Oxford University Press, 2012.

16th-century Irish people
People of Elizabethan Ireland
English emigrants to Ireland
English soldiers
Irish soldiers
Year of birth unknown
Year of death unknown